Hisonotus notatus is a species of catfish in the family Loricariidae. It is a freshwater species native to Brazil, where it occurs in the São João River and other coastal drainages of the stae of Rio de Janeiro. It reaches 4.3 cm (1.7 inches) SL and is the type species of the genus Hisonotus. It was formerly considered conspecific with Hisonotus thayeri, but a 2016 revision by Fernanda Martins and Francisco Langeani redescribed H. notatus and adopted the new name H. thayeri to some populations formerly classified as H. notatus.

References 

Otothyrinae